Xanthophyllum korthalsianum is a tree in the family Polygalaceae. It is named for the Dutch botanist Pieter Willem Korthals.

Description
The inflorescences are branched and may be much longer than the leaves.

Distribution and habitat
Xanthophyllum korthalsianum is a rare species, growing naturally in Sumatra and Borneo. Its habitat is ridge forest at around  altitude.

References

korthalsianum
Trees of Sumatra
Trees of Borneo
Plants described in 1864
Taxa named by Friedrich Anton Wilhelm Miquel